USS Assurance is a name used more than once by the US Navy:

 , a fleet minesweeper commissioned at Boston, Massachusetts, on 21 November 1958.
 , an ocean surveillance ship delivered to the Military Sealift Command on 1 May 1985.

References 
 

United States Navy ship names